E. Amos Sumner (June 2, 1924 – May 18, 2010) was an American politician. He served as a Democratic member of the Florida House of Representatives.

Life and career 
Sumner attended the University of Georgia.

In 1965, Sumner was elected to the Florida House of Representatives, serving until 1966.

Sumner died in May 2010, at the age of 85.

References 

1924 births
2010 deaths
Democratic Party members of the Florida House of Representatives
20th-century American politicians
University of Georgia alumni